The Akosombo Port is a port on Lake Volta. It is located near the Akosombo Dam at Akosombo.

See also
Boankra Inland Port
Takoradi Harbour
Tema Harbour

References

Ports and harbours of Ghana